Yirlania Arroyo Fonseca (born 28 May 1986) is a Costa Rican international footballer who plays as a goalkeeper for the Costa Rica women's national team.

Career
Arroyo won her first international cap in a match against Nicaragua on 20 October 2007, and went on to make 40 appearances for Costa Rica.

She has played club football for Arenal Coronado in Costa Rica and Sky Blue FC in the United States.

References

External links
 
 Profile  at Fedefutbol
 

1986 births
Living people
Women's association football goalkeepers
Costa Rican women's footballers
Costa Rica women's international footballers
2015 FIFA Women's World Cup players
Pan American Games competitors for Costa Rica
Footballers at the 2011 Pan American Games
Footballers at the 2015 Pan American Games
NJ/NY Gotham FC players
Costa Rican expatriate  footballers
Costa Rican expatriate sportspeople in the United States
Expatriate women's soccer players in the United States